Intelsat 702 (also known as IS-702 and Intelsat 7-F2) is a geostationary communication satellite that was built by Space Systems/Loral (SSL). It is located in the orbital position of 32.9 degrees east longitude and it is currently in an inclined orbit. The satellite is owned by Intelsat. The satellite was based on the Loral FS-1300 platform and its estimated useful life was 15 years.

The satellite was successfully launched into space on June 17, 1994, at 07:07:19 UTC, using an Ariane 44L vehicle from the Guiana Space Center in French Guiana, together with the satellites STRV 1A and STRV 1B. It had a launch mass of 3,695 kg.

The Intelsat 702 is equipped with 26 transponders in C band and 10 in Ku band to provide broadcasting, business-to-home services, telecommunications, VSATnetworks.

In September 2016, the satellite reached end-of-life and was retired to a graveyard orbit. Intelsat 17, another Space Systems Loral satellite, assumed its communications role after delivery to orbit in late 2010.

References

Spacecraft launched in 1994
Intelsat satellites